Nathan Fletcher (born December 31, 1976) is an American politician and professor serving on the San Diego County Board of Supervisors for the 4th District since 2019, serving as chair from 2021 to 2023. Previously, he served two terms in the California State Assembly and is a professor of practice in political science at the University of California, San Diego.[2]

Early life and education
Fletcher was born and spent the early years of his life in Carson City, Nevada. His parents divorced when he was two years old, and his mother Sherrie Morgan, moved with him to Smackover, Arkansas. There, she met and married Danny Farley, who worked at an International Paper factory. His biological father, Randy Fletcher, a former deputy sheriff, obtained a custody decree in Nevada. Randy Fletcher then drove to Arkansas, where he took Nathan from his mother and returned to Nevada with him. A Nevada judge granted custody to Randy Fletcher with visitation rights for Sherrie. Nathan describes his father as abusive and said this period of his life was "a living hell".

Fletcher was sent back to live with his mother when he was eight years old; he remained with her and Danny Farley for the rest of his childhood. He says that when he talks about his dad, he is referring to his stepfather Danny Farley, whom he counts as his only father figure. His childhood and family background became an issue during his campaign for mayor, when opponents accused him of dishonesty because of apparent inconsistencies in talking about his father. He had tried to keep the details of his background private, but faced with the accusations, he and his mother gave an interview to KPBS in which they explained the apparent contradictions as resulting from the difference between his father and his stepfather.

He graduated from Smackover High School and moved to California, earning a Bachelor of Science in political science from California Baptist University.

Career 
After graduating from college, Fletcher worked for the International Republican Institute, a nongovernmental organization seeking to build and improve democracies around the world. This included time abroad working with non-governmental organizations in Myanmar, East Timor, Cambodia, and Serbia.

Military service

Fletcher joined the United States Marine Corps as a reservist in 1997 and became an active-duty Marine in 2002. He served as a counterintelligence/human intelligence specialist. In 2007, he was honorably discharged, with the rank of staff sergeant. He is a graduate of the U.S. Army Airborne Course and Marine Corps Mountain Warfare Training Center.

In 2004, he served eight months in the Sunni Triangle region of Iraq. Among his awards from that tour of duty are the Navy–Marine Corps Achievement Medal with Combat "V" a combat distinguishing device, Combat Action Ribbon, and Iraqi Campaign Medal. He worked in the Horn of Africa on his final deployment and earning the Joint Service Commendation Medal and Global War on Terrorism Expeditionary Medal.

During his time in Iraq, Fletcher worked to build relationships with the native population, leading his supervisors to describe him as "compassionate and focused." On April 9, 2004, Fletcher and three other Marines fended off an enemy ambush when participating in a Quick Reaction Force to aid a VIP convoy. He was responsible for authorizing 150 intelligence reports, which amounted to 31 percent of the reports generated by the team of six Counter Intelligence Marines.

Politics

District Director for United States Congress

Fletcher got his start in San Diego politics serving for two years as the District Director for Congressman Duke Cunningham. "But for most of that time, Fletcher didn’t work there. Fletcher was on active duty in the Marines," according to an investigative report by the Voice of San Diego published in 2012 on Fletcher's relationship with the jailed former Congressman.

State Assembly

In 2008, he was elected to the Assembly representing the 75th Assembly District, which includes the City of Poway, portions of Escondido, La Jolla, University City, Mira Mesa, Scripps Ranch, Rancho Bernardo, Rancho Peñasquitos, and Carmel Valley, and the communities of Fairbanks Ranch, and Rancho Santa Fe. He won with 52.2% of the vote. He was re-elected in 2010 with 60.5% of the vote.

In his first term, Fletcher had a number of pieces of legislation signed into law, including legislation relating to veterans, job creation, water infrastructure, and health care. He was chosen as one of two Republican Party whips in 2010.

As a legislator, he also authored Chelsea's Law, which toughened penalties and restrictions on violent sexual predators. On February 25, 2010, 17-year-old Chelsea King was murdered by John Albert Gardner when jogging at a local community park in Rancho Bernardo. Garner was a registered sex offender at the time of the murder and later admitted to killing 14-year-old Amber DuBois in 2009. In response to the public outrage, Fletcher sponsored Chelsea's Law to prevent future tragedies by offering life without parole sentencing to criminal charged with violent sex offenses. The bill was signed into law by Gov. Arnold Schwarzenegger on September 10, 2010 

In May 2010, Fletcher gave an Assembly floor speech in support of California Senate Joint Resolution 9, which called upon Congress and the President to repeal the U. S. Armed Forces policy known as "Don't ask, don't tell" (DADT). Fletcher, a Marine Corps veteran who served in Iraq and other locations, was the first California Republican legislator to endorse ending this policy. His speech was described as "one of the most eloquent on the floor for some time."

That same year, Fletcher opposed AJR 15, the "Uniting American Families Act," that sought to "support the removal of legal barriers to immigration by permanent same-sex partners"  and "allow gay and lesbian citizens to sponsor their partners for United States citizenship."

Fletcher was a proponent of implementing a Mandatory Single Sales Tax on out-of-state corporations that conduct business in California but operate outside the state. The legislation, supported by Gov. Jerry Brown, would have closed a loophole in the tax code and used the savings to offer tax incentives to local industries in order to spawn job creation in California. Fletcher's vote was instrumental in obtaining a two-thirds majority vote to guarantee the bill's passage in the Assembly during the final meeting of the 2011 legislative session. The bill, however, failed in the California State Senate.

Other notable legislation that Fletcher supported include the Corporate Tax and Middle-Class Scholarship Fund, Assembly Bill 877 Prohibiting Discrimination Against Transgendered Individuals, and the Foreclosure Reduction Act.

In 2012, Fletcher helped prevent a janitor's strike in San Diego by calling CEOs on behalf of workers to advocate for expanding health care coverage.

San Diego mayoral election

In June 2011, Fletcher announced his candidacy for the mayorship of San Diego. Fletcher started the race as a registered Republican. However, a few weeks after the local Republican Party endorsed his opponent Carl DeMaio, Fletcher announced he was leaving the Republican Party to become an independent. Fletcher ultimately came in third in the June 2012 primary and did not advance to the general election.

On August 20, 2013, Fletcher, now a Democrat, officially filed his intention to be a mayoral candidate with the City Clerk's Office—a day before a tentative agreement was reached for Mayor Bob Filner's resignation. Fletcher was endorsed by California Governor Jerry Brown and Attorney General Kamala Harris. However, in the election held November 19, 2013, he came in third with 24.3 percent of the vote and thus did not advance to the runoff election in February 2014. On November 20, he conceded and endorsed fellow Democrat David Alvarez.

Change of political parties
Fletcher departed from the Republican Party midway through his first mayoral campaign. He has said this was due to extreme partisan politics and to the party's shift away from his core values, not due to the local Republican Party endorsing his opponent. On May 4, 2013, Fletcher announced on his Facebook page that he was joining the Democratic Party. Fletcher was widely embraced by Democratic leaders, many of whom had been courting him for years to join the party.

San Diego County supervisor
In 2018 Fletcher ran for an open seat representing District 4 on the San Diego County Board of Supervisors. There were five candidates in the June primary, with the top two advancing to the November general election. Fletcher was the first-place finisher and former District Attorney Bonnie Dumanis placed second. He was the Democratic candidate for the seat and Dumanis was the Republican, though the election was officially nonpartisan. During the campaign Fletcher touted various endorsements including now President Joe Biden, former Governor Jerry Brown, then-Lieutenant Governor Gavin Newsom, the Sierra Club, labor unions, and the San Diego Democratic Party. Fletcher was also endorsed by the San Diego Union-Tribune, stating "We think the county needs a wake-up call, and Fletcher is far more likely to jolt it out of complacency." Fletcher won the general election, defeating Dumanis 67.37% to 32.63%.

Fletcher was appointed to the California Air Resources Board by Governor Newsom on January 28, 2019.

Fletcher was unanimously elected as Chair of the San Diego County Board of Supervisors on January 5, 2021.

Has also serves as the board chair of the San Diego Metropolitan Transit System. In that capacity, he has voiced support for the extension of the San Diego Trolley to the San Diego International Airport.

Fletcher succcessfully ran for reelection in 2022.

Non-political activities

Business
Following the end of his legislative term on December 2, 2012, Fletcher became a senior director of corporate development at Qualcomm. He said in a statement that his position would include developing global strategies for wireless health initiatives, mobile education, and the protection of intellectual property, but will not involve lobbying or government relations. His title was later changed to Global Strategic Initiatives, and in 2017, he announced he was leaving Qualcomm to dedicate more time to UCSD and community issues.

Fletcher also served as a television commentator for Fox 5 San Diego and paid contributor to San Diego Magazine.

Education
In January 2013, Fletcher was appointed as the first Professor of Practice (officially an Adjunct Professor) at the University of California, San Diego. He teaches classes in the department of political science, as well as mentoring and advising students and helping to develop public policy projects. Professor of Practice was a new, privately funded position at the University intended to "provide students with a deeper understanding of the practical application of a particular field of study and help promote the integration of academic scholarship with practical experience from applications professionals."

In 2013, an investigative report by the San Diego Union Tribune noted that, unlike the other candidates for mayor, Fletcher did not make his college transcripts public, nor provide them to UCSD before his hiring. The university said it did not ask for his transcript and did not need it for the appointment as a professor of practice.

Political and community activities

Fletcher remains politically active, by supporting Democratic candidates and progressive causes.  He is a member of the national advisory board of Organizing for Action, the successor organization of President Barack Obama's 2012 re-election campaign. He is a member of the Statewide Leadership Council of the Public Policy Institute of California, and a member of the Aspen Institute Global Alliances Program Advisory Board. He is also a member of the National Advisory Board of the Truman National Security Project. He is a delegate of the California Democratic Party, member of San Diego Democratic Central Committee, was a 2016 delegate to the Democratic National Committee, and has been active in supporting Democratic candidates and causes such as efforts to raise the minimum wage. He also remains involved in efforts to ensure implementation of Chelsea's Law. He is a member of the World Economic Forum Global Agenda Council on Human Rights,. He is a Kauffman Fellow and Tribeca Innovative Disruptive Fellow.

On March 13, 2013, Fletcher brought together law enforcement, community, business, labor, and faith-based leaders to form San Diegans United for Common Sense Immigration Reform. The coalition came to an agreement to advocate for a pathway to citizenship, reform to the immigrant visa system, smart border security, and basic human rights.

Fletcher has served on the Board of Directors for the Marine Corps Recruit Depot Historical Society, a member of the American Legion, life member of Veterans of Foreign Wars, member of the board of directors of the San Diego Opera, Executive Committee of CONNECT, Community Advisory Council for Voices for Children, and the San Diego Regional Advisory Council of the California League of Conservation Voters Education Fund.

Personal life
Fletcher is an Ironman Triathlete, marathon runner, alpine mountaineer, and mountain biker. In 2003, he married Mindy Tucker, who had served as campaign manager and deputy chief of staff for Governor Arnold Schwarzenegger. The couple has two adopted children. They separated on December 1, 2014, and filed for divorce in January 2015. In an NBC story they issued a joint statement, "We have made the best decision for our family. It is an amicable divorce, and we remain good friends. Our first priority is our children, and we hope that everyone will respect our privacy as we make this transition." In September 2015, Fletcher began dating Lorena Gonzalez, who currently serves in the California State Assembly representing California's 80th District. They were married January 1, 2017.

In December 2018, Fletcher publicly acknowledged his 19-year-old son. Fletcher told the Voice of San Diego news site, "My 19-year-old son just came into our life, and it is wonderful."

At 4:00 AM on January 15, 2022, a "suspicious" fire broke out on the front of the couple's home. The family was awakened by smoke alarms and was able to leave the house through a side door. No one was injured, but the fire caused an estimated $36,000 in damage. A San Diego police investigation concluded that the fire was deliberately set and offered a $1,000 reward for help in identifying the arsonist.

References

External links
Official Campaign website
Join California Nathan Fletcher

Living people
1976 births
21st-century American politicians
Baptists from Arkansas
Businesspeople from San Diego
California Baptist University alumni
California Democrats
California Independents
California Republicans
Members of the California State Assembly
People from Smackover, Arkansas
Politicians from Carson City, Nevada
Politicians from San Diego
Qualcomm people
San Diego County Board of Supervisors members
United States Marine Corps personnel of the Iraq War
United States Marine Corps reservists
United States Marines